The Polatlı–İzmir high-speed railway is a  long high-speed railway currently under construction in Turkey. Once completed, it will be the longest high-speed railway in the country, surpassing the Istanbul-Ankara HSR which holds the title since 2014.

Travel times between Ankara-Afyon and Ankara-Izmir are expected to be 1h 30min and 3h 30min, respectively.

Construction of the initial section began in 2012, but was suspended in 2018 when almost 50% of the works had been completed on some sections. The construction was restarted in 2022.

Sections and speeds 
Constructions are divided into six sections starting from the split point:

Notes

References

High-speed railway lines in Turkey
Transport infrastructure under construction in Turkey
Polatlı
Menemen District
Transport in Ankara Province
Transport in İzmir Province